The 2005 Super Fours was the fourth cricket Super Fours season. It took place in June and July and saw 4 teams compete in a 50 over league and a Twenty20 league. Knight Riders won the 50 over league, achieving their second title, whilst V Team won the Twenty20 league, also achieving their second title in the format, and their second in two years.

Competition format
In the one day tournament, teams played each other twice in a round-robin format, with the winners of the group winning the tournament. Matches were played using a one day format with 50 overs per side.

The group worked on a points system with positions within the divisions being based on the total points. Points were awarded as follows:

Win: 15 points. 
Tie:  6 points. 
Loss: 0 points.

The Twenty20 competition was expanded from the 2004 edition of the Super Fours: in 2005, each team played each other once in a round-robin format, with the winners of the group winning the tournament. 2 points were awarded for a win.

Teams

50 over

Results

Source: Cricket Archive

Twenty20

Results

Source: Cricket Archive

References

Super Fours